Secret Agent is the third solo album by British singer Robin Gibb, released in 1984. The album enjoyed limited success, mostly in Europe and Australia. The lead single "Boys Do Fall in Love" made the Top 10 in Italy and South Africa.

Background
The album followed on from How Old Are You? the previous year with Robin's twin brother Maurice again co-writing and playing keyboards. Three songs were written by all three Bee Gees, including oldest brother Barry. The album is heavily electronic, relying mostly on multi-layered keyboards with bass and drums played on synthesizers. Recording took place at Criteria Studios as Barry Gibb was occupying the Bee Gees' own Middle Ear studio at the time, recording his solo debut Now Voyager.

Robin and Maurice continued the Bee Gees tradition of "making it up" in the recording studio. Assistant engineer Richard Achor recalled the years when Robin and Maurice would come in with only ideas for songs. Robin wrote lyrics with Maurice, and sometimes they set up drum and synthesizer grooves first, in which a song would work out from that. Maurice played synthesizer and keyboard, but played relatively little on the finished tracks in favor of Rob Kilgore's expertise. Robin had long been interested in the electronic sound and Maurice was a willing accomplice. The concept was to carry on the sound of the big freestyle hit by Shannon, her 1983 song "Let the Music Play", which is why Robin brought in the same producers, Mark Liggett and Chris Barbosa, and musicians Rob Kilgore and Jim Tunnell to work on the album.

Robin asked Barbosa and Liggett to produce this album. As Barbosa explained: "Robin really wanted a dance hit, he specifically wanted to avoid a Bee Gees sound-alike record."

"The Gibb project was different for us in that way", Liggett added. "We're not usually working with mega budgets, and its better that way. All the money comes out of your pockets anyway."

Cash Box called "In Your Diary" a "a pleasing piece which suffers slightly from its formula quality, but benefits strongly from the familiar strength of the Gibb’s reliable performance, production and styling."

Track listing

Personnel
Main artist
 Robin Gibb – lead vocals, harmony and backing vocals

Musicians and production
 Evan Rogers, Cindy Mizelle, Audrey Wheeler, Arlene Gold, Lari White, Lori Ellsworth – backing vocals
 Rob Kilgore – keyboards, synthesizers, guitars
 Maurice Gibb – keyboards, synthesizers, backing vocals
 Jim Tunnell – guitars, backing vocals
 Chris Barbosa – sequencers

Chart positions

References

1984 albums
Robin Gibb albums
Polydor Records albums
New wave albums by English artists
Synth-pop albums by English artists
Albums produced by Robin Gibb
Albums produced by Maurice Gibb